Salt pruning is the process by which saline mists generated by seawater are driven ashore by winds and thus over time alter the shape of trees or shrubs. The process degrades foliage and branches on the windward side of the plant that faces the body of saline water, more than it does the foliage on the landward side. The resultant growth form is asymmetrical, appearing "swept back" away from the ocean.

Examples
There are numerous examples worldwide of this phenomenon. In the eastern United States on Long Island occurrences of salt-pruned Quercus stellata are observable in Flax Marsh. In San Diego County, California, a colony of Pinus torreyana has been salt-pruned by spray from the Pacific Ocean.

The logo of the Torrey Pines Golf Course in La Jolla, California, features a salt-pruned Torrey pine.

See also

 Ice pruning
 Lone Cypress

References

Additional sources
 

Physiological plant disorders